Tabanus quatuornotatus is a species of biting horse-fly.

Description
This species is present in most of Europe, in the Near East and in North Africa. In particular, it can be found, as well as in Europe, also in Russia, Transcaucasus, Middle Asia, Morocco, Tunisia, Turkey and in Iran.

Description
Tabanus quatuornotatus can reach a body length of about 15–18 mm. These medium-sized hairy blood-sucking horse-flies shows hairy eyes with three purple eye bands. Antennae are entirely black. Palpi are short and oval, rounded at apex. Moreover frontal callus is squared and dull black. Also the upper part of subcallus is polished black. The abdomen is black and grey coloured.

References

External links
 
 
 Biodiversidad Virtual
 Diptera.info

Tabanidae
Diptera of Europe
Insects described in 1820
Taxa named by Johann Wilhelm Meigen